Simon Webb (born 19 January 1978 in County Mayo) is an Irish retired footballer.

A trainee with Tottenham Hotspur from August 1994, Simon went on loan to Leyton Orient in October 1999. He signed for Bohemians from Purfleet in July 2000 where he won two league winning medals (2000/01 and 2002/03) and a FAI Cup winners medal (2001). He was sent off in the 2002 FAI Cup Final as Bohemians were beaten 2-1 by Dundalk .

At the end of the 2004 season, Webb moved along with Damian Lynch to Drogheda United. He has become a regular fixture in the side, captaining the side on occasions and has added to his collection of medals by winning the FAI Cup in 2005 and the Setanta Cup in 2006 and 2007.

He retired in January 2008.

Webb played for the Republic of Ireland national under-19 football team in the 1996 UEFA European Under-18 Football Championship finals in Luxembourg.

Honours
Bohemians
 League of Ireland (2): 2000-01, 2002-03
 FAI Cup (1): 2001

Drogheda United
 League of Ireland (1): 2007
 FAI Cup (1): 2005
 Setanta Sports Cup (2): 2006, 2007

References

1978 births
Living people
Association footballers from County Mayo
Republic of Ireland association footballers
Republic of Ireland youth international footballers
League of Ireland players
Bohemian F.C. players
Drogheda United F.C. players
Leyton Orient F.C. players
English Football League players
Association football fullbacks